Wouldn't It Be Great is the forty-fifth solo studio album by American country music singer-songwriter Loretta Lynn. It was released by Sony Legacy on September 28, 2018. The album is produced by Lynn's daughter Patsy Lynn Russell and John Carter Cash, the son of Johnny Cash and June Carter Cash.

The album is the third in a planned series of five albums recorded at Cash Cabin Studio in Hendersonville, Tennessee, following 2016's Full Circle and White Christmas Blue. The album is a mixture of new songs and new versions of songs Lynn has previously recorded.

Background
The album was originally scheduled to be released on August 18, 2017. On July 12, 2017, it was announced that the release date was being postponed until 2018 and all remaining tour dates for 2017 were being cancelled while Lynn recovered from the stroke she suffered in May 2017. Lynn stated that she wished to postpone the release date "because this record is so special for me. It deserves me at my best."

Crystal Gayle, Lynn's sister, revealed in an Instagram post on January 8, 2018, that Lynn had fallen in her home on New Year's Day and fractured her hip. This news meant continued delays for the album, which had been rumored to be scheduled for a spring release.

Lynn revealed in a Facebook post on July 11, 2018, that she had returned to work, shooting a music video for the album on July 10 at her ranch in Hurricane Mills, Tennessee.

On August 22, 2018, Lynn announced that the album would be released on September 28, 2018, saying, "Before my stroke last year I had been working hard on a new album and was so excited about it. This new record means so much to me, but this last year I had to focus on my health and decided to hold up the release. It's been a tough year, but I'm feelin' good now and look forward to it comin' out. It was really important to me to be a part of it being released and I'm excited to celebrate it with y'all. I hope y'all love it."

Previous recordings
Six songs from the album are new versions of songs previously recorded by Lynn:

 "Wouldn't It Be Great?", was previously recorded by Lynn on her 1985 album, Just a Woman, and again with Dolly Parton and Tammy Wynette for their 1993 album, Honky Tonk Angels.
 "God Makes No Mistakes" was previously recorded by Lynn on her 2004 album, Van Lear Rose.
 "My Angel Mother" was previously recorded by Lynn in 1960 for Zero Records, this recording was released by Vocalion Records on 1968's Here's Loretta Lynn.
 "Don't Come Home a Drinkin'" was previously recorded by Lynn on her 1967 album of the same name.
 "Darkest Day" was previously recorded by Lynn in 1960 as her third single for Zero Records, and on her 1966 album, You Ain't Woman Enough.
 "Coal Miner's Daughter" was previously recorded by Lynn on her 1971 album of the same name, and again with Miranda Lambert and Sheryl Crow for the album Coal Miner's Daughter: A Tribute to Loretta Lynn.

Promotion
The album's lead single, "Wouldn't It Be Great?", was released on August 22, 2018, along with the album's pre-order.

The second single from the album, "Ruby's Stool", premiered on Parade.com on September 12, 2018, and was subsequently made available for streaming and digital download.

The album became available for streaming exclusively on NPR Music’s website as a part of their First Listen series on September 20, 2018.

"Ain't No Time to Go" was released as the album's third single on September 26, 2018. The single's music video, directed by Dave McClister, premiered the same day on CMT's website and was later uploaded to Lynn's official Vevo channel.

Commercial performance
Wouldn't It Be Great debuted and peaked at No. 8 on the US Billboard Top Country Albums chart dated October 13, 2018, based on 9,000 equivalent album units. It sold a further 3,200 copies the following week and charted at No. 43. The album also charted on the US Billboard 200 chart at No. 78 and the US Billboard Top Americana/Folk Albums chart at No. 2. The album has sold 26,000 copies in the United States as of April 2019.

Track listing

Personnel
Adapted from the album liner notes.

Ronnie Bowman – backing vocals
Mike Bub – upright bass
Sam Bush – fiddle
Trey Call – second engineer, research, production assistant
Shawn Camp – acoustic guitar, backing vocals, mandolin
John Carter Cash – producer, liner notes
Charlie Chadwick – cello
Dennis Crouch – upright bass
Richard Dodd – mastering
Mark Fain – upright bass
Paul Franklin – steel guitar
Lloyd Green – steel guitar
Frank Harkins – art direction, art design
Tony Harrell – piano
Jamie Hartford – electric guitar, mandolin
Byron House – upright bass
John Jackson – A&R
Rick Lonow – drums
Loretta Lynn – lead vocals, backing vocals
David McClister – photography
Ronnie McCoury – mandolin
Pat McLaughlin – mandolin, acoustic guitar
Larry Perkins – banjo
John Randall – backing vocals
Patsy Lynn Russell – producer
Randy Scruggs – acoustic guitar
Bryan Sutton – banjo, acoustic guitar
Chuck Turner – engineering, mixing
Robby Turner – dobro, steel guitar
Jeff White – acoustic guitar
Laura Weber White – acoustic guitar, fiddle

Charts

References

2018 albums
Legacy Recordings albums
Loretta Lynn albums
Albums produced by John Carter Cash